Lestes ochraceus is a species of damselfly in the family Lestidae, the spreadwings. It is known commonly as the ochre spreadwing. It is native to much of central Africa.

This species occurs in open freshwater habitat types such as pools and slow-running streams. It is a widespread species which is probably not threatened at this times.

References

O
Odonata of Africa
Fauna of Central Africa
Insects described in 1862
Taxonomy articles created by Polbot